Nancy H. Yeide was the head of the Department of Curatorial Records at the National Gallery of Art, Washington, from 1990 to 2017. She is a specialist in World War Two-era provenance research, particularly relating to the Hermann Göring collection of which she has written the first comprehensive catalog.

Yeide holds a Master of Arts degree from American University. She appeared in the documentary film, The Rape of Europa, in which she  discussed the Goering collection.

Selected publications
The American Association of Museum's Guide to Provenance Research. 2001. (With Konstantin Akinsha & Amy L. Walsh) 
Beyond the Dreams of Avarice: The Hermann Goering Collection. Laurel Publishing, Dallas, 2009.

References

External links
Nancy Yeide talking about Nazi Loot in American Collections.
A conversation with Nancy Yeide. Jordan Mejias, Frankfurter Allgemeine Zeitung (German language) English translation.

American art curators
American women curators
Year of birth missing (living people)
Living people
American University alumni
21st-century American women